Lambdina pultaria, the southern oak looper, is a species of geometrid moth in the family Geometridae. It is found in North America.

The MONA or Hodges number for Lambdina pultaria is 6889.

References

Further reading

 

Ourapterygini
Articles created by Qbugbot
Moths described in 1858